Melton may refer to:

Places
 Melton, Victoria, a satellite city outside Melbourne, Australia
 Electoral district of Melton, the Victorian Legislative Assembly electorate based on Melton
 Melton, Victoria (suburb), a suburb of Melton
Melton South, Victoria, a suburb of Melton
Melton West, Victoria a suburb of Melton, Victoria, Australia
 City of Melton, a Victorian Local Government Area based in Melton
 Borough of Melton, a local government district in Leicestershire, England
 Melton Mowbray, the main town of Melton borough, England
 Melton (UK Parliament constituency)
 Melton, East Riding of Yorkshire, England
 Melton, Suffolk, England

Other uses
Melton (cloth), a twill woven and felted woolen cloth
Melton (horse), a British Thoroughbred racehorse
Melton (surname)
a brand of brass instruments by Meinl-Weston